South Fork, California may refer to:
 South Fork, Butte County, California
 South Fork, Madera County, California
 South Fork, Mendocino County, California
 South Fork, Humboldt County, California